Grégory Dutil (born 30 December 1980 in Nice) is a French professional footballer who currently plays as a forward for FC Miami City.

Dutil played on the professional level in the Spanish Segunda División for Racing Club de Ferrol.

References

Grégory Dutil profile at foot-national.com

1980 births
Living people
French footballers
French expatriate footballers
Expatriate footballers in Spain
AC Arlésien players
Racing de Ferrol footballers
FC Martigues players
SC Toulon players
ÉFC Fréjus Saint-Raphaël players
Nîmes Olympique players
FCA Calvi players
Association football forwards